The  Trichogrammatidae are a family of tiny wasps in the Chalcidoidea that include some of the smallest of all insects, with most species having adults less than 1 mm in length, with species of Megaphragma having an adult body length less than 300 μm. The over 840 species are placed in about 80 genera; their distribution is worldwide. Trichogrammatids parasitize the eggs of many different orders of insects. As such, they are among the more important biological control agents known, attacking many pest insects (especially Lepidoptera).

They are not strong fliers and are generally moved through the air by the prevailing winds. Their fore wings are typically somewhat stubby and paddle-shaped, with a long fringe of hinged setae around the outer margin to increase the surface area during the downstroke. Males of some species are wingless, and mate with their sisters inside the host egg in which they are born, dying without ever leaving the host egg.

Trichogrammatidae have unique nervous systems resulting from the necessity to conserve space. They have one of the smallest nervous systems, with one particularly diminutive species, Megaphragma mymaripenne, containing as few as 7,400 neurons. They are also the first (and only) known animals which have functioning neurons without nuclei.

The neurons develop during pupation with functional nuclei and manufacture enough proteins to last through the short lifespans of the adults. Before emerging as an adult, the nuclei are destroyed, allowing the wasp to conserve space by making the neurons smaller. Even without nuclei (which contain the DNA, essential for manufacturing proteins to repair damage in living cells), the neurons can survive because the proteins manufactured as a pupa are sufficient.

Their fossil record extends back to the Eocene aged Baltic amber.

Genera 

 Adelogramma
 Adryas
 Aphelinoidea
 Apseudogramma
 Asynacta
 Australufens
 Bloodiella
 Brachista
 Brachistagrapha
 Brachygrammatella
 Brachyia
 Brachyufens
 Burksiella
 Centrobiopsis
 Ceratogramma
 Chaetogramma
 Chaetostricha
 Chaetostrichella
 Densufens
 Doirania
 Emeria
 Enneagmus
 Epoligosita
 Epoligosita
 Eteroligosita
 Eutrichogramma
 Haeckeliania
 Hayatia
 Hispidophila
 Hydrophylita
 Ittys
 Ittysella
 Japania
 Kyuwia
 Lathromeris
 Lathromeroidea
 Lathromeromyia
 Megaphragma
 Microcaetiscus
 Mirufens
 Monorthochaeta
 Neobrachista
 Neobrachistella
 Neocentrobia
 Neocentrobiella
 Neolathromera
 Nicolavespa
 Oligosita
 Oligositoides
 Ophioneurus
 Pachamama
 Paracentrobia
 Paraittys
 Paratrichogramma
 Paruscanoidea
 Pintoa
 Poropoea
 Prestwichia
 Probrachista
 Prochaetostricha
 Prosoligosita
 Prouscana
 Pseudobrachysticha
 Pseudogrammina
 Pseudoligosita
 Pseudomirufens
 Pseuduscana
 Pterandrophysalis
 Pteranomalogramma
 Pterygogramma
 Sinepalpigramma
 Soikiella
 Szelenyia
 Thanatogramma
 Thoreauia
 Trichogramma
 Trichogrammatella
 Trichogrammatoidea
 Trichogrammatomyia
 Tumidiclava
 Tumidifemur
 Ufens
 Ufensia
 Urogramma
 Uscana
 Uscanella
 Uscanoidea
 Uscanopsis
 Viggianiella
 Xenufens
 Xenufensia
 Xiphogramma
 Zaga
 Zagella
 Zelogramma

References 

 Doutt, R.L. & Viggiani, G. 1968. The classification of the Trichogrammatidae (Hymenoptera: Chalcidoidea). Proceedings Calif. Acad. Sci. 35:477-586.
 Matheson, R. & Crosby, C.R. 1912. Aquatic Hymenoptera in America. Annals of the Entomological Society of America 5:65-71.
 Nagarkatti, S. & Nagaraja, H. 1977. Biosystematics of Trichogramma and Trichogrammatoidea species. Annual Review of Entomology 22:157-176.

External links 

 Universal Chalicidoid Database
 UC Riverside Trichogrammatidae page

 
Apocrita families
Insects used as insect pest control agents
Biological pest control wasps